Sugung-dong is a dong, neighbourhood of Guro-gu in Seoul, South Korea.

See also 
Administrative divisions of South Korea

References

External links
 Guro-gu official website
 Map of Guro-gu at the Guro-gu official website
 Gung-dong resident office website
 Chronicle of Beopjeong-dong and Haengjeong-dong at the Guro-gu official website

Neighbourhoods of Guro District, Seoul